Lord, You Have Come to the Lakeshore, in some versions You Have Come to the Seashore (Spanish: Pescador de hombres, "Fisher of Men") is a 1974 Spanish religious song by Cesáreo Gabaráin. It was translated into English by Gertrude C. Suppe, George Lockwood and Raquel Gutiérrez-Achon.

It was Pope John Paul II's favourite song., and the Polish lyrics (titled Barka, "The Barge") were written by a Salesian of Don Bosco Stanisław Szmidt also in 1974.

In media
The song is used in episode 6 of season 4 of the Netflix Money Heist television series.

References

Spanish songs
Christian songs
1974 songs
Pope John Paul II
Internet memes